Luke Bambridge and David O'Hare were the defending champions but chose not to defend their title.

Sanchai Ratiwatana and Christopher Rungkat won the title after defeating Harri Heliövaara and Henri Laaksonen 6–0, 7–6(11–9) in the final.

Seeds

Draw

References
 Main Draw
 Qualifying Draw

Fairfield Challenger - Doubles
Fairfield Challenger